Michael James Duff (born 11 January 1978) is a Belfast born  football manager and former Burnley  player who is currently manager of Barnsley. In a career spanning from 1995 to 2016, in which he made over 700 appearances, he played as a defender for Carterton Town, Cheltenham Town, Cirencester Town (on loan) and Burnley. At international level, Duff earned 24 caps for Northern Ireland. From 2018 to 2022, he was the manager of  club Cheltenham Town, having previously managed the Burnley reserves for two years.

Duff led Cheltenham Town to their first ever automatic promotion from League Two as manager on 27 April 2021. His team subsequently finished the season as League Two champions.

He is believed to be the only player to have played in each of the top eight tiers of English football in ascending order.

Playing career
Although born in Belfast, Duff was raised in Bedale, North Yorkshire. As a school boy he represented North Yorkshire and joined the Darlington Football Club School of Excellence before moving to Cheltenham in 1994.

Spotted by Cheltenham Town scout Derek Bragg playing for Carterton Town, Duff was invited by Mike Davis, youth team manager to join Cheltenham, then playing in the Southern League. He had a spell on loan at Cirencester Town before returning to Cheltenham when Steve Cotterill took over as manager. He became a regular for Cheltenham, and went on to play 242 games and score 15 times, including a 93rd-minute winner in a 3–2 victory at home to Yeovil Town in 1999 that secured Cheltenham Town promotion to the Football League.

On 5 July 2004, he made a £30,000 switch to Burnley where he became a regular, if not always automatic, first-team choice. Over the next couple of seasons he established himself as first choice right-back, although he had equally often played at centre-back. His first Burnley goal was credited in a League Cup game against Carlisle United, even though it might equally have been credited as an own goal. He finally got incontrovertibly on the score-sheet on 14 October 2006 against Hull City.

Duff was part of two of Northern Ireland's finest international moments of recent years; as a late substitute in their 1–0 victory over England on 7 September 2005 and then in a 3–2 victory over Spain on 6 September 2006.

In the 2007–08 season Duff picked up a serious injury during the Championship match against Crystal Palace at Turf Moor. The injury ruled Duff out for almost a year, causing him to miss the first half of the following campaign. He suffered multiple ligament damage and hamstring damage as well as a cruciate knee injury. Duff started his first Premier League match on Boxing Day 2009 against Bolton Wanderers at Turf Moor, having made his debut as a substitute in the preceding game versus Wolverhampton Wanderers. In doing so, he completed the rare feat of having played in each of the top eight tiers of English football in ascending order during his career: the Hellenic League with Carterton Town, the Southern League (Midland Division) with Cirencester Town, the Southern League (Premier Division), Conference (prior to its 2004 re-organisation), League Two and League One with Cheltenham Town, and the Championship and Premier League with Burnley.

After Burnley's relegation, Duff remained with the team and, over the next three seasons, was a frequent, though not automatic, first team choice as injuries and competition for places saw him play in roughly half of Burnley's league matches in each of the seasons through this period. By the summer of 2013, having earned a season extension for 2013–14 on the basis of his appearances, Duff was the longest-serving player at the club. On 2 July 2014, Duff signed a new one-year contract with Burnley, Duff remained the only survivor of the squad that reached the Premier League in 2009 and his final deal meant the former Northern Ireland international entered his 11th season with the club.

Duff retired from playing professionally at the end of 2015–16 season, having helped Burnley win the Championship title and promotion to the Premier League. As a result of this, Duff became the second footballer, after Neil Clement of West Bromwich Albion, to be promoted to the Premier League on three occasions with the same club.

Managerial career

Cheltenham Town
On 10 September 2018, Duff was appointed to his first managerial appointment at his former club Cheltenham Town in League Two. He was awarded the League Two Manager of the Month award for September 2019 and February 2020. On 1 November 2019, Duff signed a contract extension which will keep him at Cheltenham Town until June 2023.

On 27 April 2021, Duff secured the club’s first ever automatic promotion in the Football League with a 1-1 draw against Carlisle United. This achievement resulted in Duff being named the 2020–21 EFL League Two Manager of the Season at the league's annual awards ceremony held on 29 April 2021. Duff led Cheltenham to their highest-ever league finish in the 2021–22 season with a 15th placed finish in League One. On 13 June 2022, Duff informed the Board of Directors that he wished to depart the club for new opportunities.

Barnsley
On 15 June 2022, Duff was appointed head coach of recently relegated League One side Barnsley on a three-year deal. Duff won the EFL League One Manager of the Month award for November 2022 having had a 100% record in their two matches to take his side into the play-off places. He won the award for a second consecutive month after ten points from four matches saw Barnsley rise to fourth in the table. Duff also won the Manager of the Month award for February 2023 after having gained 16 points from 6 matches, remaining unbeaten throughout the month.

Career statistics

Club

International
Source:

Managerial statistics

Honours

As a player
Cheltenham Town
Football League Third Division play-offs: 2002
Football Conference: 1998–99
FA Trophy: 1997–98

Burnley
Championship: 2015–16; runner-up: 2013–14; play-offs: 2009

Individual
PFA Team of the Year: 2001–02 Third Division

As a manager
Cheltenham Town
League Two: 2020–21

Individual
League Two Manager of the Season: 2020–21
League One Manager of the Month: November 2022, December 2022, February 2023
League Two Manager of the Month: September 2019, February 2020

References

External links

NIFG profile

1978 births
Living people
Association footballers from Belfast
Association footballers from Northern Ireland
Northern Ireland B international footballers
Northern Ireland international footballers
Association football defenders
Darlington F.C. players
Carterton F.C. players
Cheltenham Town F.C. players
Cirencester Town F.C. players
Burnley F.C. players
Southern Football League players
National League (English football) players
English Football League players
Premier League players
Football managers from Northern Ireland
Cheltenham Town F.C. managers
Barnsley F.C. managers
English Football League managers